"The Two Lonely People" is a 1971 jazz standard by Bill Evans, with lyrics by Carol Hall. It first appeared on The Bill Evans Album in 1971 and later appeared on the Bill Evans and Stan Getz collaboration album But Beautiful and the Bill Evans and Tony Bennett collaboration album, Together Again. Jazz improv compared it to "classical music or a great ensemble".

References

External links

Piano solo transcription

Songs about loneliness
1970s jazz standards
1971 songs